Pablo Nicolás Míguez Farre (born June 19, 1987 in Montevideo, Uruguay) is a Uruguayan footballer currently playing for Alianza Lima in Peruvian Primera División .

References

External links
 
 

1987 births
Living people
Uruguayan footballers
Uruguayan expatriate footballers
Danubio F.C. players
Unión de Santa Fe footballers
Club Alianza Lima footballers
Olimpo footballers
Club Puebla players
FBC Melgar footballers
Uruguayan Primera División players
Argentine Primera División players
Peruvian Primera División players
Liga MX players
Expatriate footballers in Argentina
Expatriate footballers in Mexico
Expatriate footballers in Peru
Uruguayan expatriate sportspeople in Argentina
Uruguayan expatriate sportspeople in Mexico
Uruguayan expatriate sportspeople in Peru
Association football midfielders